Eric Bongers (24 January 1924 – 7 August 2002) was a South African sailor. He competed in the Finn event at the 1956 Summer Olympics.

References

External links
 

1924 births
2002 deaths
South African male sailors (sport)
Olympic sailors of South Africa
Sailors at the 1956 Summer Olympics – Finn
Place of birth missing
20th-century South African people